The following is a timeline of the history of the city of Aden, Yemen.

Prior to 19th century

 24 BCE - Romans in power (approximate date).
 628 CE - Badhan (Persian Governor) converts to Islam, affecting Aden.
 750 CE - Abbasids in power (approximate date).
 904 - Ibn al-Fadl in power (approximate date).
 1062 - Ali al-Sulayhi in power.
 1135 - Attempted siege by "ruler of the Arabian Gulf island of Kish/Qais."
 1173 - Ayyubids in power.
 1229 - Rasulids in power.
 1330 - Moroccan traveller Ibn Battuta visits Aden (approximate date).
 1420s - Chinese explorer Zheng He visits Aden (approximate date).
 1454 - Tahirids in power.
 1500 - Aqueduct built from Bir Mahait (approximate date).
 1511 - Italian traveller Varthema visits Aden.
 1513 - Aden "unsuccessfully attacked by the Portuguese under Albuquerque."
 1538 - Aden taken by Ottoman forces of Hadım Suleiman Pasha.
 1630 - Ottomans ousted.
 1735 - Sultan of Lahej in power.
 1745 - Aden besieged by Zaydi forces.

19th century

 1839
 January: Aden occupied by British forces.
 November: Abdali anti-British unrest; crackdown.
 British colonial postal mail begins operating.
 1840
 May: Abdali anti-British unrest; crackdown.
 June: Sultan of Lahej Shaykh Muhsin ibn Fadl signs treaty with British.
 1850 - Aden becomes a free port.
 1852 - Catholic church built.
 1858 - Grand Synagogue of Aden built.
 1867 - Aqueduct built.
 1868 - Jebel Ihsan peninsula and nearby Sirah island sold by Sultan of Lahej to British.
 1869 - Suez Canal opens in Egypt, affecting Aden as a port.
 1871 - Protestant church built.
 1876 - "Settlement committee" (local government) established.
 1880 - August: French poet Rimbaud visits Aden.
 1882 - Sheikh Othman bought by British.
 1889 - "Port trust" (local government) established.
 1890 - Big Ben Aden clocktower built.

20th century

1900s-1950s
 1915
 Lahej-Aden railway construction begins.
 Population: 36,900 town.
 1917 - British Royal Air Force Khormaksar station established.
 1924 - Sukkat Shalom synagogue established.
 1925 - Arab Literary Club formed.
 1929 - Arab Reform Club active.
 1937 - 1 April: City becomes capital of the British Colony of Aden.
 1946 - Population: 56,849.
 1947
 Legislative council established.
 December: 1947 Aden riots against Jews.
 1951 - Aden Women's Club formed.
 1954
 British Petroleum refinery built in Little Aden.
 27 April: British queen visits Aden.
 1955 - Aden Legislative Council election, 1955 held.
 1956 - General Labour Union established.
 1958 - Al-Ayyam newspaper begins publication.
 1959 - January: Legislative council election held.

1960s-1990s
 1963 - January: Aden becomes part of the Federation of South Arabia.
 1964 - 16 October: Aden Legislative Council election, 1964 held.
 1966 -  established.
 1967
 January: Front for the Liberation of Occupied South Yemen-National Liberation Front conflict.
 June: Suez Canal closes, affecting port of Aden.
 29 November: Aden becomes capital of People's Republic of South Yemen; British forces depart.
 1968 - Ar-Rabi Ashar Min Uktubar newspaper begins publication.
 1970 - Aden becomes part of the Peoples Democratic Republic of Yemen.
 1971 -  established.
 1972 - Ittihad al-Udaba (writers' guild) established.
 1973 - Population: 264,326.
 1975
 Suez Canal reopens, affecting port of Aden.
 University of Aden established.
 1985 - Aden Airport new terminal built.
 1986 - January: South Yemen Civil War.
 1990 - City becomes part of the newly formed Republic of Yemen.
 1991 - Rimbaud House opens.
 1992
 General Hospital built.
 29 December: 1992 Yemen hotel bombings.
 1994
 1994 civil war in Yemen.
 Population: 564,335 governorate.
 1996 - University of Aden museum established.
 1997 - 27 April: Yemeni parliamentary election, 1997 held.
 2000 - 12 October: USS Cole bombing.

21st century

 2009 - Population: 684,322.
 2012 - Population: 760,923.
 2015
 19 March: Battle of Aden Airport.
 25 March: Battle of Aden begins.

See also
 Aden history
 Timeline of Yemeni history
 List of British representatives at Aden, 1839-1967
 Timelines of other cities in Yemen: Sana'a

References

This article incorporates information from the Arabic Wikipedia and German Wikipedia.

Bibliography

Published in 19th century
 
 
 
 
 
 
 
 
 

Published in 20th century
 
 
 
 
 
 
  (fulltext)
 Garston, J. "Aden: The First Hundred Years," History Today (Mar 1965) 15#3 pp 147–158. covers 1839 to 1939. 
 Gavin,  R.J.  Aden Under British Rule: 1839–1967 (C. Hurst & Co. 1975).
 
 
 
 

Published in 21st century
 Walker, Jonathan. Aden Insurgency: The Savage War in South Arabia 1962–67 (Spellmount Staplehurst, 2003) 
 Mawby, Spencer. British Policy in Aden & the Protectorates, 1955-67: Last Outpost of a Middle East Empire (2005). 
 Hinchcliffe, Peter, et al. Without Glory in Arabia: The British Retreat from Aden (2006).
 
 
 
 Mawby, Spencer. "Orientalism and the failure of British policy in the Middle East: The case of Aden." History 95.319 (2010): 332–353. online
 
Scott Steven Reese.  Imperial Muslims: Islam, Community and Authority in the Indian Ocean, 1839-1937. (A history of Aden)  Edinburgh  Edinburgh University Press, 2017.  ix + 212 pp.   .
 Edwards, Aaron. "A triumph of realism? Britain, Aden and the end of empire, 1964–67." Middle Eastern Studies 53.1 (2017): 6-18.

External links

 Map of Aden, 1978
 
 
  

 
Aden
Aden
Years in Yemen